A bellwether is a leader or an indicator of trends.

In politics, the term often applies in a metaphorical sense to characterize a geographic region where political tendencies match in microcosm those of a wider area, such that the result of an election in the former region might predict the eventual result in the latter. In economics, a 'bellwether' is a leading indicator of an economic trend.

Sociologists apply the term in the active sense to a person or group of people who tend to create, influence, or set trends.

Etymology 

The term derives from the Middle English bellewether, which referred to the practice of placing a bell around the neck of a castrated ram (a wether) leading a flock of sheep. A shepherd could then note the movements of the animals by hearing the bell, even when the flock was not in sight.

The word was first used in the above meaning in the 15th century.

In economics 
In the world of economics and finance, a 'bellwether' is a leading indicator of an economic trend.

In the stock market, a 'bellwether' is a company or stock taken to be a leading indicator of the direction in a sector, in an industry or in the market as a whole. Bellwether stocks therefore serve as short-term guides. JPMorgan Chase is a U.S. example of a bellwether. As one of the major banks in the United States, its stock sets the tone for the rest of the banking industry. JPMorgan Chase also has contracts with companies in other industries, so its performance is reflected in other sectors of the market. Tata Consultancy Services is similarly a bellwether for technology stocks in the Indian markets, BSE and NSE.

Similarly, a bellwether bond is "a government bond whose changes in interest rate are believed to show the future direction of the rest of the bond market."

The quarterly Bellwether Report, published by the Institute of Practitioners in Advertising (IPA), monitors trends in expenditure in the UK advertising and marketing industry.

In law

In politics 
In politics, the term bellwether often applies in a metaphorical sense to characterize a geographic region where political tendencies match in microcosm those of a wider area, such that the result of an election in the former region might predict the eventual result in the latter. In a Westminster-style election, for example, a constituency, the control of which tends frequently to change, can have a popular vote that mirrors the result on a national scale.

An electoral bellwether can be a ward, precinct, town, county, or other district that accurately reflects how a geographic region (state, province, etc.) will vote during elections. Bellwethers in the United States typically change every election cycle due to shifts in the electorate. Bellwethers also differ by the type of elections: a midterm bellwether differs from a presidential bellwether or a party primary bellwether.

American statistician and political scientist Edward Tufte and his student Richard Sun defined electoral bellwethers (in the US) into the following categories:

 All-Or-Nothing Bellwether — states or counties that choose the national winner every time. Examples include the State of Missouri and the counties of Vigo County, IN; Lincoln County, MT; Van Buren County, AR; Logan County, AR; Eddy County, NM; and Ferry County, WA.
 Barometric Bellwether — a place that accurately reflects the national share of votes. Vigo County, Indiana, is one example.
 Swingometric Bellwether — a county that mirrors important swings or shifts in the national electorate. Examples include Sandoval County, NM, and Washoe County, NV.

Australia
In Australian federal elections, the Division of Robertson in New South Wales became the nation's new longest-running bellwether seat, continuously won by the party that also won government since the 1983 federal election.

Previously, the electoral division of Eden-Monaro elected its Member of Parliament from the party which won government at every federal election from 1972 until 2016, when the record was broken after Labor won the seat, while the Coalition won government. The Division of Lindsay in NSW, has elected its Member of Parliament from the party which won government in every Federal election since its creation in 1984 until 2016. Both Lindsay and Eden-Monaro lost their bellwether status at the 2016 federal election, both electing Labor MPs, despite a narrow Coalition win nationwide.

The Division of Makin in South Australia was a bellwether division from 1984 to 2010, although ceased its bellwether record in 2013, when Makin stayed Labor as the Coalition regained power nationwide. Also, in terms of nationwide two party preferred vote, Eden-Monaro, Lindsay, Robertson and Makin have bucked the bellwether trend in the past by voting Liberal at the 1998 federal election. In purely statistical terms, the state of New South Wales, which has the largest population of any Australian state or territory, could also be considered a "bellwether", as, until the 2016 federal election the party which wins government has won the majority of House of Representatives seats in that state at every election since 1963. Unlike many bellwethers, these are cited by analysts solely for their record and are not usually attributed to demographic factors that reflect the median of Australia.

Canada
In the Canadian province of Ontario, Sarnia—Lambton (and its predecessor ridings) voted for the winning party in every federal election from 1963 until 2011. This streak was broken in 2015, when the Conservative Party held the district while the Liberal Party won government, and the riding has become reliably Conservative since. Toronto—St. Paul's has only elected three opposition MPs since it contested its first election, as St. Paul's, in 1935, although it has become reliably Liberal in recent years. Burlington and St. Catharines currently share the longest active streak, having elected an MP from the winning party since 1984. Also in Ontario, Peterborough—Kawartha (called Peterborough until 2015) has consistently elected the party which has won the provincial election since 1977. In federal politics, the coterminous federal electoral district Peterborough—Kawartha (also called Peterborough until 2015) elected a member of the winning party from 1965 to 1979 and 1984 until 2021, inclusive.

In Alberta, the provincial electoral district Peace River has elected only three opposition MLAs since the province was founded in 1905.

In Manitoba, the federal district of Winnipeg South has voted for the winning party in each election since it was re-formed in 1988; a previous version of the same riding, which elected MPs from 1917 until 1974 inclusive, voted against the national winner only three times, most recently in 1965. Also in Manitoba, the provincial riding of Rossmere, which has existed since 1969, has voted for the candidate from the governing party in every general election since it was first contested except for that of 1977; it also elected opposition MLAs at by-elections in 1979 and 1993.

Germany
Since the creation of the Federal Republic of Germany (then West Germany) in 1949, the state where the leading party list vote (Zweitstimmen) matched the party of the subsequently chosen Chancellor the most times is Schleswig-Holstein (with two misses: 1969 and 2005), followed by the state of Lower Saxony (with misses in 1949, 1969 and 2005). Both states lie in the North of the country, neither containing many large industrial cities (the biggest being Kiel and Hannover respectively), nor large rural Catholic populations, the traditional base of the SPD and CDU/CSU respectively. Schleswig-Holstein is also famous for having had several state elections result in a one-seat majority for the winning coalition and Lower Saxony's 1998 election (in which Gerhard Schröder was the SPD candidate) is often seen as a "trial run" for the subsequent federal election (which Schröder also won). 

Of the first vote constituencies (Erststimmen), the constituency of Pinneberg (also located in Schleswig-Holstein) has voted for the party of the subsequently chosen Chancellor in all elections except for 1949.

Both the 1949 and the 1969 elections were rather narrow, the former resulting in a one-vote majority in the election for chancellor and the latter resulting in a 12-seat majority that had broken down due to defections by 1972. In 2005 SPD and CDU/CSU were only separated by one percentage point and four seats in the final tally. In the 2021 German federal election the SPD placed first in 12 out of 16 states, including Schleswig-Holstein and Lower Saxony as well as federally while being led by former First Mayor of Hamburg, Olaf Scholz, the State of Hamburg borders both Lower Saxony and Schleswig-Holstein, but Scholz did not run in Hamburg during that election, instead representing the District Potsdam – Potsdam-Mittelmark II – Teltow-Fläming II in Brandenburg (where he incidentally ran against Annalena Baerbock candidate for chancellor of Alliance 90/The Greens, drawing additional media attention to the District).

India
Two individual seats, Valsad and West Delhi, have successfully voted for the victorious party for the last eleven general elections in India. Furthermore, the party that wins the majority of seats in Delhi has always gone on to form the national government since 1998.

The state of Uttar Pradesh is also seen as a bellwether, with the national government having been formed the majority of times by the party that won the most seats in the state.

Ireland
Ireland has a proportional representation electoral system, in which politicians are elected by the single transferable vote. Bellwethers here can only be measured by the number of candidates from each side elected to Ireland's multiple-seat constituencies that elect an odd number of members. Between the 1981 general election and 2011 general election, Meath and its successors, Meath East and Meath West, have elected a majority of Fianna Fáil TDs in years when Fianna Fáil formed the government, and a majority of Fine Gael and Labour TDs when those parties formed the government.

New Zealand
In New Zealand, there are three generally accepted bellwether electorates: Hamilton East and Hamilton West, both based around the city of Hamilton, and Northcote on Auckland's North Shore. Hamilton East, first contested in 1972, has missed three elections — 1993, 1999, and 2005. They were all held by the National Party in the 2017 election although Labour formed the government after the election. Since the National Party was still returned as the largest party in Parliament, however, the two electorates did in fact retain their bellwether status, albeit to a limited extent.

Philippines
In the Philippines, the winner of Philippine presidential election has won in Negros Oriental in all instances since 1935 except for 1961 and 2016, and in Basilan since its creation in December 1973 (first election in 1981). After Negros Oriental voted for the runner-up in 2016, Agusan del Norte and Lanao del Sur have the longest active streak, having its provincial winners be the elected president since the 1969 election.

For vice presidential elections, Pangasinan has voted for the winner in all elections save for 1986 and 2016.

Portugal
In every general election to the Portuguese National Assembly since the restoration of democracy in 1975, the electoral district of Braga has voted for the party or coalition that has won the most seats in the election. (Note that following the elections of 2015, a minority government was eventually formed by the second-largest party in the Assembly.)

In every general, European Union, mayoral (except 2009), or presidential elections since the Carnation Revolution, the Portuguese capital of Lisbon voted for the party or coalition that won more percentage in the elections.

Romania
Presidential elections

The counties that voted in the first round for the winning candidate:
 Bucharest - 1 miss (2014), from 1990 on. The highest rate (88%, 7/8). The longest continuous streak (6 in a row: 1990–2009).
 Constanța - 1 miss (2014), from 1990 on. The highest rate (88%, 7/8). The longest continuous streak (6 in a row: 1990–2009).
 Alba - 2 misses (1992 and 2000), from 1990 on (75%, 6/8). The longest continuous streak, still active (4 in a row: 2004–2019).
 Arad - 2 misses (1992 and 2000), from 1990 on (75%, 6/8). The longest continuous streak, still active (4 in a row: 2004–2019).
 Bihor - 2 misses (1992 and 2000), from 1990 on (75%, 6/8). The longest continuous streak, still active (4 in a row: 2004–2019).
 Brașov - 2 misses (1992 and 2000), from 1990 on (75%, 6/8). The longest continuous streak, still active (4 in a row: 2004–2019).
 Cluj - 2 misses (1992 and 2000), from 1990 on (75%, 6/8). The longest continuous streak, still active (4 in a row: 2004–2019).
 Sibiu - 2 misses (1992 and 2000), from 1990 on (75%, 6/8). The longest continuous streak, still active (4 in a row: 2004–2019).
 Timiș - 2 misses (1992 and 2000), from 1990 on (75%, 6/8). The longest continuous streak, still active (4 in a row: 2004–2019).
 Prahova - 2 misses (1996 and 2014), from 1990 on (75%, 6/8).
 Ilfov - 2 misses (2004 and 2014), from 1990 on (75%, 6/8).
 Bistrița-Năsăud - 3 misses (1992, 2000 and 2004), from 1990 on (63%, 5/8).
 Satu Mare - 3 misses (1992, 2000 and 2004), from 1990 on (63%, 5/8).
 Sălaj - 3 misses (1992, 2000 and 2004), from 1990 on (63%, 5/8).
 Maramureș - 3 misses (1996, 2000 and 2004), from 1990 on (63%, 5/8).
 Suceava - 3 misses (1996, 2004 and 2014), from 1990 on (63%, 5/8).
 Caraș-Severin - 3 misses (2000, 2004 and 2014), from 1990 on (63%, 5/8).

Sweden
The expression "" ('As Ljungby votes, Sweden votes') was coined in the early-1970s, but more recently (in 2006) voting results in Karlstad, Kalmar, and Halmstad more closely resembled the result of the whole nation in elections to the Riksdag.

According to Statistics Sweden, election results in Karlstad have been closest to the national results for three consecutive elections, a fact often highlighted by media through Gallup Polls showing voting intentions in the area.

United Kingdom
United Kingdom constituencies of the House of Commons all see a change at least every few decades to avoid malapportionment, apart from a few island seats. It is possible to dispute any long-term bellwether, citing such changes. However, those below have kept the bulk of their electors in the main, named constituency identified with the place they are named after.

Long-running bellwether constituencies
 Dartford has reflected the overall result at every general election since 1964. 
 Portsmouth North, and part predecessor Portsmouth West, have reflected every overall result since 1966.
 Loughborough, Northampton North and Watford have reflected every result since the February 1974 election.
 Stevenage, and part predecessor Hertford and Stevenage, have reflected the overall result in every general election since the February 1974 election.
 Stourbridge, and part predecessor Halesowen and Stourbridge, has reflected the overall result in every general election since 1979. 
 Hendon, and part predecessor Hendon North, has reflected the overall result in every general election since 1979. 
 Great Yarmouth, Pudsey and Worcester have reflected the overall result in every general election since 1979. 
 Amber Valley,  Corby, Erewash, Harlow, Hastings and Rye, Norwich North, Reading West, South Derbyshire and Stafford and constituencies have reflected every result since 1983.
Finchley and Golders Green, Nuneaton, and Thurrock have reflected the overall result in every general election since 1997

Former bellwether constituencies
Bristol North West and Lincoln reflected every result since the October 1974 election until 2017.
Brentford and Isleworth had reflected the overall result from 1979 until 2015.
Bury North has reflected the overall result from 1983, with the only exception being 2017.
Basildon reflected every result from its creation in 1974 to its abolition in 2010.
 Southampton Test reflected every result from 1966 to 2010.
 Luton South (and its predecessors Luton East and Luton) had reflected the overall result from 1951 until 2010.
Braintree has reflected the overall result from 1979, with the only exception being 2005.
Gravesham (and its predecessor Gravesend) reflected the overall result from 1955 until 2005.

While not strictly a bellwether, Sunderland South was often used in election programming to predict the swing of a general election - principally because it was often the first to declare - with variable results.

London Borough elections
Since Greater London formed during 1964–1965, Hammersmith and Fulham London Borough Council elections have matched those of the party who run (usually with the GLA, or more lately Mayor of London and Assembly) the most London authorities except went its "miss" to Labour's majority of London councils in 2010 (which has endured since) and the reverse miss in 1978 and 1982. In the latter two results no overall control was the local result.

Scottish Parliament
The constituencies of Cunninghame North, Stirling and Na h-Eileanan an Iar have all elected MSPs from the party which won the plurality of seats in the election overall for every Scottish Parliament election.

Also, the constituencies of Almond Valley, Dundee City West, Edinburgh Eastern, Glasgow Southside, Kilmarnock and Irvine Valley and Mid Fife and Glenrothes each elected an MSP from the largest party in the 2011 and 2016 elections. This continues the trend that their predecessor constituencies (Livingston, Dundee West, Edinburgh East & Musselburgh, Glasgow Govan, Kilmarnock & Loudoun and Fife Central) achieved in the 1999, 2003 and 2007 elections.

Welsh Parliament 
The following constituencies (as of the 2021 election) have elected MSs from the party which won the plurality of seats in the election overall for every Senedd (and former Assembly) election since 1999:

As Labour has won the most seats since the Welsh Assembly was founded in 1999, this is a list of seats which have always voted Labour.

United States
The American states with the current longest streak of voting for the winners in the electoral college are Michigan, Pennsylvania, and Wisconsin; their streaks date back to only 2008. The American bellwether states can also be determined in different ways (with respect to presidential elections):

Highest percentage for varying lengths of time

 Ohio – 3 misses (1944, 1960, 2020) from 1896 on (90.6%, slightly "too Republican").
 Nevada – 3 misses (1908, 1976, 2016) from 1904 on (90.0%, slightly "too Democratic").
 New Mexico – 3 misses (1976, 2000, 2016) from 1912 on (89.3%, slightly "too Democratic").
 Florida – 3 misses (1960, 1992, 2020) from 1928 on (87.5%, slightly "too Republican").
Highest percentage for a set length of time

Electoral record of the states for presidential elections, 1896–2020:
 Ohio – 29 wins out of 32 elections (90.6%)
 New Mexico – 25 wins out of 28 elections (89.3%)
 Illinois – 27 wins out of 32 elections (84.4%)
 Nevada – 27 wins out of 32 elections (84.4%)

Highest percentage of the current party system, 1980-2020

 Ohio – 1 miss (2020) (90.9%)
 Nevada – 1 miss (2016) (90.9%)
 New Mexico – 2 misses (2000, 2016) (81.8%)
 Florida – 2 misses (1992, 2020) (81.8%)
 Colorado – 2 misses (1996, 2016) (81.8%)
 New Hampshire – 2 misses (2004, 2016) (81.8%)
 Pennsylvania – 2 misses (2000, 2004) (81.8%)

Smallest deviation from the national average

Another way to measure how much a state's results reflect the national average is how far the state deviates from the national results. The states with the least deviation from a two-party presidential vote from 1896 to 2012 include:

 Ohio – 2.2%
 New Mexico – 2.8%
 Illinois – 3.6%
 Missouri – 3.7%
 Delaware – 3.7%

States that were considered bellwether states from the mid-to-late 20th century include: 
 Delaware – Perfect from 1952 to 1996. As a result of a massive Democrat-strong growth in housing/population in New Castle County, Delaware (suburban Philadelphia, with the old industrial city of Wilmington), voters tend to lean strongly Democratic. That county had been a bellwether: 1936 to 1996.
 Arizona – Perfect from 1912 to 1956.
 North Dakota – Perfect from 1896 to 1936.
 Kansas – Perfect from 1900 to 1936.
 Missouri was often referred to as the Missouri bellwether as it produced the same outcome as the national results in the presidential election 96.2% of the time for the century between 1904 and 2004, only missing in 1956. It is considered to have lost its bellwether status with the 2008 presidential election.
 Washington – 1 miss from 1900 to 1956 (in 1912).
 Minnesota – 1 miss from 1920 to 1976 (in 1968).
 Texas – 1 miss from 1928 to 1988 (in 1968).
 Arkansas – 1 miss from 1960 to 2004 (in 1968).
 Idaho – 2 misses (1960, 1976) from 1904 to 1988.
 Tennessee – 2 misses (1924, 1960) from 1912 to  2004.
 New Jersey – 2 misses (1948, 1976) from 1920 to 1996.
 Virginia – 2 misses (1960, 1976) from 1928 to 1988. Was traditionally Republican at the time. Otherwise, the state was traditionally Democratic. Although the 2012 election was not included in this bellwether run, Virginia was actually the closest state to the national vote in 2012. Donald Trump, however, managed to win in the next election without Virginia.
 Illinois – 3 misses (1884, 1916, 1976) from 1852 to 1996, the most reliable in this period. As the Chicago metropolitan area shifted to become overwhelmingly Democratic, the state lost its bellwether status. No Republican had ever won the White House without taking Illinois prior to 2000.
 California – 3 misses (1912, 1960, 1976) from 1888 to 1996.
 Utah – 3 misses (1912, 1960, 1976) from 1900 to 1988.
 Wyoming – 3 misses (1944, 1960, 1976) from 1900 to 1988.
 Montana – 3 misses (1960, 1976, 1996) from 1904 to 2004.
 Kentucky – 3 misses (1920, 1952, 1960) from 1912 to 2004.
 Oklahoma – 3 misses (1924, 1960, 1976) from 1912 to 1988.
 New Hampshire – 3 misses (1948, 1960, 1976) from 1936 to 2000.
 Colorado – 3 misses (1960, 1976, 1996) from 1948 to 2012.
 Iowa – 3 misses (1976, 1988, 2000) from 1964 to 2016.

States that were bellwether states a very long time ago include:
 Pennsylvania – One miss from 1800 to 1880 (in 1824).
 Indiana – One miss from 1852 to 1912 (in 1876).
 Wisconsin – One miss from 1860 to 1912 (in 1884).
 New York – One miss from 1880 to 1944 (in 1916). It previously had a perfect streak from 1816 to 1852. Had the most electoral votes during the entire period.

The Territory of Guam had no misses from 1984 to 2012 (100.0%); it lacks electoral college votes, but conducts a presidential straw vote on local election day. 

From 1996 through 2012, Ohio was within 1.85% of the national popular vote result. Due to the Electoral College system, bellwethers of sufficient size form the focus of political attention and presidential campaigns as swing states. As of 2016, Ohio and, with almost double its electors, Florida were seen by political pundits and national campaigns as the most important swing states due to their large number of electoral votes and politically mixed breakdown. No Republican has won the presidency while losing Ohio, so the party campaigns there intensively. In 2000, the presidential election inadvertently led to the abolition of varied machines intra-state for vote counting in Bush v. Gore in which Bush's team saw off the pending recount of some Florida votes, that has been later proven to have been almost certain to have, likewise, seen a Bush win. A full-state recount could have restored the votes of thousands of older voters whose dimpled and double-voted ballots were indecipherable to machines but would have been clear in a ballot-by-ballot review. In the 2020 election Joe Biden defeated incumbent Donald Trump without winning either state. He won Arizona, which no other Democratic candidate had won since 1996, and Georgia (of similar population size to Ohio), which none had since 1992 meaning the number of swing states has increased and a winning Democratic campaign could, potentially, focus much less on Ohio and Florida.

Others

Brazil 
In Brazil's direct presidential elections the winner has taken the state of Minas Gerais in the last-round from 1955 to 2022, inclusive. It has more than 21 million residents, includes Belo Horizonte and has been birthplace of the record of nine presidents to date. The state has 10.1% of the population. It is varied in topography and larger than Metropolitan France.

France
Since the substantial role began in 1958, under the French Fifth Republic, the president has since 1965 in the final (second) round always won: diminutive Ardèche and with about double its population each, Calvados, Charente-Maritime, Indre-et-Loire and Loire.  Together these account for more than 3 million residents.  Each combines urban with rural and many touristic sites.

South Korea
Since the 1987 presidential election, the central, thus somewhat mountainous, province of North Chungcheong is the only one of the 17 first-tier divisions in which the most voted candidate for the presidency has consistently become the national winner.  It has more than one and half million residents.

Spain
Since democracy was restored in 1977, up to 2019 two provinces have always voted for the winning party (Zaragoza and Huesca). The Autonomous Community of Aragon hosts these provinces. Aragon is, moreover, the sole Autonomous Community to have done so. It has more than a million residents and combines much rural land with mountains and socially diverse urban communities.

Taiwan
From the first competitive multi-party elections in 1996, Changhua County, a west coast region of Taiwan of more than a million residents, is where the preference has matched the elected President.

See also
 As Maine goes, so goes the nation
 Bellwether trial
 Early adopter
 Harbinger
 Peer-mediated instruction
 Swing state
 Sentinel species
 Tipping-point state
 Will it play in Peoria?

References

Social concepts
Economic concepts
Political science terminology
Metaphors referring to sheep or goats